Malwathu Maha Viharaya (also called Malwatta temple) is a Buddhist monastery located in Kandy, Sri Lanka. It is the headquarters of the Malwatta chapter of Siyam Nikaya and one of the two Buddhist monasteries that holds the custodianship of sacred tooth relic of Buddha kept in Sri Dalada Maligawa, Kandy. The chief incumbent of the Malwathu Maha Viharaya is the Mahanayaka thero of Malwatta chapter of Siyam nikaya, a leading Buddhist monastic fraternity in Sri Lanka. The present chief incumbent of Malwathu Maha Viharaya is Thibbatuwawe Sri Siddhartha Sumangala Thero.

History
This temple is believed to be built by Senasammatha Vickramabahu (1473-1511) along with a stupa and a double storey ordination hall (Uposhathagaraya) in the late 15th century or early 16th century. It was originally built as the residence of three monks but today it houses many Buddhist monks including the monks of Karaka Sangha Sabha (executive council) of Malwatta chapter of Siyam Nikaya. The building known as ‘poya ge’ is used as the assembly hall for the important meetings of the monastic fraternity. This building was built during the reign of king Kirti Sri Rajasinha of Kandy.

The monastery
Malwathu Maha Viharaya consists of two sections, the Uposatha Viharaya which is also known as ‘Poyamalu Viharaya’ and the other Pushparama Viharaya popularly known as Malwathu Viharaya. Poyamalu Viharaya is the oldest section of the Vihara complex which is today recognized as an archaeologically protected monument.

Chief Incumbents
The following is a list of chief incumbents of Malwathu Maha Viharaya, Kandy who are also the Mahanayaka theros of Malwatta chapter of Siyam Nikaya. Appointment of senior Buddhist monks to the Mahanayaka position in Sri Lanka began with the re-establishment of Upasampada higher ordination in 1753 on the initiatives taken by Sangharaja Weliwita Sri Saranankara Thero during the reign of king Kirti Sri Rajasinha of Kandy. 
 Thibbatuwawe Sri Buddha Rakkitha Thero (1753–1773) තිබ්බටුවාවේ ශ්‍රී බුද්ධරක්ඛිත හිමි(1753_-_1773)
 Medawala Sri Rathana Jothi Thero (1773–1774) - 
 Daramitipola Sri Dhamma Rakkitha Thero (1774–1787) -දරමිටිපොල ශ්‍රී ධම්මරක්ඛිත හිමි (1774-1787)
 Morathota Rajaguru Sri Dammakannda Thero (1787–1811) - 
 Kobekaduwe Rajaguru Siriniwasa Thero (1811–1819) - 
 Welivita Sri Saranakara Thero (1819–1822) - 
 Gammulle Sri Sumana Thero (1822–1825) - 
 Kotikapola Sri Rathanajothi Thero (1825–1826) - 
 Kandegedara Sri Rewatha Thero (1826–1829) - 
 Galgiriyawe Sri Sumangala Thero (1829–1850) - 
 Parakumbure Sri Wipassi Thero (1850–1862) - 
 Medagama Sri Dewamitta Thero (1862–1877) - 
 Hippola Sri Sobhitha Thero (1877–1893) - 
 Tibbotuwawe Sri Sumangala Thero (1893–1913) - 
 Galgiriyawe Sri Buddharakkitha Thero (1913–1919)  ගල්ගිරියාව ශ්‍රී බුද්ධරක්ඛිත මහාථෙර
 Amunugama Sri Piyadassi Thero (1919–1924) - 
 Abanwelle Sri Sumangala Thero (1924–1927) - 
 Pahamune Sri Sumangala Thero (1927–1945) - 
 Rambukwelle Sri Shobitha Thero (1946–1955) - රඹුක්වැල්ලේ ශ්‍රී සෝභිත මහාථෙර
 Welivita Sri Saranankara Thero (1955–1956) - 
Purijjala Sri Saranankara Thero (1956 -1963) 
 Amunugama Sri Wipassi Thero (1964–1969) - 
 Madugalle Sri Dhamma Siddhi Thero (1969–1973) -  මඩුගල්ලේ ශ්‍රී ධම්මසිද්ධි හිමි
 Sirimalwatte Sri Ananda Thero  (1973–1989) - සිරිමල්වත්තේ ශ්‍රී ආනන්ද හිමි
 Rambukwelle Sri Vipassi Thero (1989–2004). - 
 Thibbatuwawe Sri Siddhartha Sumangala Thero (2004– ) - තිබ්බටුවාවේ ශ්‍රී සිද්ධාර්ථ සුමංගල මහා ථෙර

See also
 Asgiri Maha Viharaya

References

External links

 
Sri Dalada Maligawa (official website)
 

Buddhist temples in Kandy
Buddhist monasteries in Sri Lanka
Archaeological protected monuments in Kandy District